Strong American Schools, a project of Rockefeller Philanthropy Advisors, is a nonprofit organization supported by The Eli and Edythe Broad Foundation and the Bill & Melinda Gates Foundation that seeks to promote sound education policies for all Americans. Through its “ED in 08” information and nonpartisan advocacy campaign, it sought to inspire a debate about America’s schools and to make education a top priority in the 2008 presidential election.

Steering committee
Roy Romer, the former governor of Colorado and a former chairman of the Democratic National Committee, serves as chairman of the organization. Marc S. Lampkin, the deputy campaign manager for the 2000 Bush-Cheney presidential campaign, acts as the executive director.

Campaign goal 
The stated goal of the campaign is to achieve nationwide debate on education reform during which every presidential candidate addresses three priorities for improving education:

 Agreeing on American education standards
 Providing effective teachers in every classroom
 Giving students more time and support for learning

Details 
Strong American Schools ran its information campaign like a presidential campaign, but would not support or oppose any candidate for public office and would not take positions on legislation.  The Broad and Bill & Melinda Gates Foundations committed up to $60 million to fund the effort. Strong American Schools and the ED in 08 campaign were the successors to the STAND UP campaign launched in 2006, and had a headquarters staff in Washington, DC, and field offices in Manchester, NH and in Des Moines, IA.

The campaign was shuttered in March 2009, once it had served its purpose.

See also
2008 United States presidential election

References

External links 
ED in 08 Official Website
Roy Romer's Blog
The Bill & Melinda Gates Foundation Official Website
The Broad Foundation Official Website

Non-profit organizations based in Washington, D.C.
Educational organizations based in the United States